Amphibdellatidae is a family of flatworms belonging to the order Dactylogyridea.

Genera:
 Amphibdella Chatin, 1874
 Amphibdelloides Price, 1937

References

Platyhelminthes